The Old Eau Gallie Post Office is a historic U.S. building located at 1596 Highland Avenue, in the Eau Gallie section of Melbourne, Florida.  The building was constructed in 1890s of rusticated block and was used as a post office from 1900 to 1925.

See also
List of United States post offices

References

Gallery 

Buildings and structures in Melbourne, Florida
Eau Gallie, Florida
Post office buildings in Florida
1890s establishments in Florida